Ctenacanthidae is an extinct family of prehistoric sharks in the order Ctenacanthiformes. Species of the different genera are found in strata ranging from Devonian to Cretaceous, with a worldwide distribution.

References

External links

Prehistoric cartilaginous fish families